Gwanggyosan (582 m) is a mountain in Gyeonggi Province, South Korea. It lies on the border of Suwon and Yongin, though the wider range extends north and so also borders Uiwang, Gwacheon, Seoul, and Seongnam.

The summit offers views across Suwon, Yongin, and Bundang. The mountain is commonly hiked from Gwanggyo Reservoir in Suwon.

Gwanggyosan and Pungsu

Interpreted within the context of traditional Korean logic and beliefs – especially within the realm of Korean Confucianism – Gwanggyosan serves as Suwon's jinsan, or Guardian Mountain. This is in keeping with the logic of pungsu (known as feng shui in China), which avers that an ideal site for a city or town is one where there is a jinsan to the north, an open vista, river or a large body of water to the south, and either mountains or valleys to the east and west. As Suwon's jinsan, Gwanggyosan provides a natural landmark indicating the city's position to travelers  and acts as a sort of "shield" against the harsh winds from the north in wintertime.  Aiding Gwanggyosan in providing a favorable sense of pungsu to Suwon are the flat farms and paddies in the southern portions of Gwonseon-gu and Yeongtong-gu, Chilbo-san to the west, and the hills along Suwon's border with Yongin to the east.

Gallery

See also
 List of mountains in Korea

References 

Mountains of Gyeonggi Province
Suwon
Yongin
Mountains of South Korea